During the 1995–96 English football season, Wimbledon F.C. competed in the FA Premier League (known as the FA Carling Premiership for sponsorship reasons). It was their tenth successive season in the top flight of English football and although they finished 14th, lower than on any of the previous nine occasions, they finished high enough to maintain their top flight membership.

Season summary
With the Premiership's lowest crowds and transfer budget, Wimbledon had begun most of their top division seasons since promotion in 1986 as pre-season relegation favourites, but the "Crazy Gang" spirit kept Wimbledon going once again, although their 14th-place finish was their lowest since joining the top flight 10 seasons earlier.

Dean Holdsworth and Efan Ekoku were once again a formidable strikerforce, while Vinnie Jones was as combative as ever and Oyvind Leonhardsen's performances attracted attention from several bigger clubs. Manager Joe Kinnear managed to hold on to all his key assets, as well as adding a few more, over the close season as he grew ever more determined to defy the odds once again. 

It was the last season at Wimbledon for long-serving goalkeeper Hans Segers, who lost his place early in the season to Paul Heald and was transferred to Wolves soon afterwards. Within a few months however, Kinnear had decided on Neil Sullivan as his regular goalkeeper. 

The season saw Wimbledon play in European competition for the first (and the only) time in their history, in the Intertoto Cup. However, as Selhurst Park was unavailable the club were forced to play the matches at Brighton & Hove Albion's Goldstone Ground. The lack of home support affected Wimbledon's performances, and they finished fourth in their group of five after a 4–0 home defeat to Turkish club Bursaspor, a 1–1 draw at Slovakian side Košice, a 0–0 draw with Israelis Beitar Jerusalem at home and a 3–0 away defeat at Belgian team Charleroi.

Kit
Core became Wimbledon's kit manufacturers for the season. Birmingham-based electronics company Elonex remained the kit sponsors.

Final league table

Results summary

Results by round

Results
Wimbledon's score comes first

Legend

FA Premier League

FA Cup

League Cup

UEFA Intertoto Cup

Note: Home games in the Intertoto Cup were played at the Goldstone Ground due to unavailability of White Hart Lane

Players

First-team squad
Squad at end of season

Left club during the season

Transfers

In

Out

Transfers in:  £125,000
Transfers out:  £4,025,000
Total spending:  £3,900,000

References

Notes

Wimbledon F.C. seasons
Wimbledon